A fixed link or fixed crossing is a persistent, unbroken road or rail connection across water that uses some combination of bridges, tunnels, and causeways and does not involve intermittent connections such as drawbridges or ferries. A bridge–tunnel combination is commonly used for major fixed links.

This is a list of proposed and actual transport links between continents and to offshore islands. See also list of bridge–tunnels for another list of fixed links including links across rivers, bays and lakes.

History

Cosmopolitan Railway
In 1890 William Gilpin first proposed to connect the continents by land via the Cosmopolitan Railway. Significant elements of that proposal, such as the English Channel Tunnel, have been constructed since that era. However, the improvement of the global shipping industry and advent of international air travel has reduced the demand for many intercontinental land connections.

Trans-Global Highway
The Trans-Global Highway is a range of highway systems proposed by futurist Frank X. Didik that would link all six of the inhabited continents. People could drive cars from Australia to California via Russia and Alaska. People from New York could drive to London via Greenland. The highway would network new and existing bridges and tunnels, improving ground transportation and potentially providing a conduit for utility pipelines. However, in the Discovery Channel's "Extreme Engineering", it was noted that the Chukotka area is mostly roadless and uninhabited, and infrastructure would need to be developed completely from scratch. Chukotka is on the Eurasian side of the Bering Strait, where the highway would connect to the Americas via tunnels.

Europe

English Channel

There is no public highway connection between Great Britain and the European mainland; only a rail connection, the Channel Tunnel.

A cross channel tunnel was first proposed in 1802 and construction actually started in 1881 before being abandoned. Roll-on Roll-off ferry services provided links across the channel for vehicles.

A road tunnel was proposed in 1979, but not considered viable. Construction of the Channel Tunnel started in 1988 and the tunnel opened in 1994. Automobiles and lorries/transport trucks are loaded onto the Eurotunnel Shuttle's enclosed railway cars (similar to auto rack/motorail railway cars) for the trip through the tunnel, however. A service road tunnel runs the entire length of the crossing, but is closed to general use and used only during emergencies and for maintenance. Cyclists - both amateur and professional - have crossed the channel via the tunnel during special occasions.

There have been proposals at various times for a second channel tunnel of some kind.

Irish Sea
Various ferry services link Ireland to Britain and France. A number of options for an Irish Sea fixed crossing have been proposed over the years but none are currently under serious consideration.

Kerch Strait 
The Crimean Bridge is a pair of parallel bridges constructed by the Russian Federation, to span the Kerch Strait between the Taman Peninsula of Krasnodar Krai and the Kerch Peninsula of Crimea. The bridge complex provides for both vehicular traffic and for rail.

Germany to Denmark to Sweden

The Øresund Bridge links southern Sweden to the Danish island of Zealand. Zealand is linked to the Danish mainland and the rest of Europe by the Great Belt Fixed Link. Most travellers between Sweden and Germany, both by road and train use the  shorter route with a ferry over the Fehmarn Belt southwestwards towards Hamburg or southwards to Rostock. The Fehmarn Belt Fixed Link is planned to be opened in 2029. A Gedser-Rostock Bridge is also under consideration but has been put back as the Fehmarn Belt crossing is now under construction. Proposals also exist for a fixed link from Rügen to southern Sweden, linking Berlin and the Øresund region.

Sweden to Finland
Ferry services link Sweden to Finland via Åland. There are proposals of fixed links between Sweden and Finland. The area between Åland and Finland is shallow with many islands, able to be connected with bridges - some of which already exist. Between Umeå and Vaasa further north, there is a proposal to build the Kvarken Bridge, a series of bridges, the longest , in total . None of these proposals have been seriously investigated.

Finland to Estonia
Ferry services link Finland to Estonia as well as overground rail and road routes via Saint Petersburg in Russia. Rail Baltica is a proposal for a rail link from Finland to Estonia, Latvia, Lithuania and Poland, bypassing Russia via a Helsinki to Tallinn Tunnel. The gulf has heavy ferry traffic, and the port of Helsinki has the largest number of international passengers of any port in Europe, and most travel to Tallinn or back. Finland and Estonia share close linguistic cultural economic and historical ties and proponents of what they call "Talsinki" (a portmanteau of the names of the two capitals) point to the Øresund region as an example of a cross-national metropolitan area linked by an underwater bridge-tunnel. A combination of a Finland to Estonia and a Finland to Sweden fixed link would reduce the need for ferries on the route the MS Estonia was on when it sank in 1994 causing a loss of 852 lives, the biggest peacetime maritime disaster in the Baltic.

Italian mainland to Sicily
The Strait of Messina has a busy ferry traffic. The Strait of Messina Bridge is planned, but the construction date has been postponed several times.

Faroe Islands
Tunnels and bridges are an important part of the Faroe Islands transportation network. The longest proposed one is the 25 km Suðuroyartunnilin (Suðuroy tunnel).

Europe to Africa

Gibraltar Tunnel

The Gibraltar Tunnel is proposed to be a rail tunnel linking Africa and Europe. A tunnel would likely be an electrified rail tunnel with car shuttles due to the depth of the Strait of Gibraltar (up to ) and the length of the tunnel making it a great challenge to remove vehicle exhaust. Similar considerations led to the Channel Tunnel linking the UK and France not being a highway tunnel. There have also been proposals for a bridge over the strait, although ship traffic would complicate this solution. Car ferries currently operate across the strait.

Strait of Sicily
The proposed Strait of Sicily Tunnel would link Sicily to Tunisia. Together with the proposed Strait of Messina Bridge from Sicily to Italy this would provide a fixed link between Italy and Tunisia.

Europe to Asia

The Turkish Straits are the channel between European Turkey and Asian Turkey and consist of the (from south to north) the Dardanelles, the Sea of Marmara and the Bosphorus. Also the border between Europe and Asia runs along the Kerch Strait.

The Bosphorus

Three suspension bridges cross the Bosphorus. The Bosphorus Bridge forms part of the O1 Motorway, while the Fatih Sultan Mehmet Bridge forms part of the Trans-European Motorway.

Construction of a third suspension bridge, the Yavuz Sultan Selim Bridge, began on May 29, 2013; it was opened to traffic on August 26, 2016. The bridge was built near the northern end of the Bosporus, between the villages of Garipçe on the European side and Poyrazköy on the Asian side. It is part of the "Northern Marmara Motorway", which will be further integrated with the existing Black Sea Coastal Highway, and will allow transit traffic to bypass city traffic.

The Eurasia Tunnel is a road tunnel between Kazlicesme and Goztepe, which began construction in February 2011 and opened to traffic on 21 December 2016. The Great Istanbul Tunnel, a proposed undersea road and railway tunnel, will connect Şişli and Beykoz districts.

The Dardanelles
The Çanakkale 1915 Bridge opened in 2022, crossing the strait between the cities of Gelibolu and Lapseki.

Kerch Strait 
The Crimean Bridge is a pair of parallel bridges constructed by the Russian Federation, to span the Strait of Kerch between the Taman Peninsula of Krasnodar Krai (Russia) and the Kerch Peninsula of Crimea. The bridge complex provides for both vehicular traffic and for rail.

Africa to Asia

Suez Canal Bridge
The Mubarak Peace Bridge, also known as the Egyptian-Japanese Friendship Bridge, Al Salam Bridge, or Al Salam Peace Bridge, is a road bridge crossing the Suez Canal at El-Qantara, whose name means "the bridge" in Egyptian Arabic. The bridge links the continents of Africa and Asia.

Saudi–Egypt Causeway
The Saudi–Egypt Causeway is a proposal for a causeway and bridge between the Sinai Peninsula in Egypt and the northern part of Saudi Arabia. This would provide a direct road route between Egypt and Saudi Arabia without going through Israel or Jordan. A causeway faces considerable political hurdles as the disruption of Israeli shipping access to the Red Sea was seen as a casus belli by Israel ahead of the Six-Day War. There is a car ferry between Safaga, Egypt and Duba, Saudi Arabia. The two uninhabited islands in the strait (Tiran island and Sanafir island), which might be used for a bridge, tunnel or causeway, were disputed between Egypt and Saudi Arabia until President Abdel Fatah al-Sisi of Egypt officially ceded them to Saudi Arabia in 2016/2017. The potential construction of a fixed link was cited in some media reports as contributing to the cession.

Bridge of the Horns
The Bridge of the Horns is a proposed construction project to build a bridge between the coasts of Djibouti and Yemen across the Bab-el-Mandeb, the strait between the Red Sea and Gulf of Aden. There are no ferry services on this route as of 2018.

Asia

Sri Lanka
The Palk Strait bridge proposal between India to Sri Lanka. India  Boat Mail train and ferry service provided a train and ferry service from India to Sri Lanka until the First World War. An India–Sri Lanka HVDC Interconnection is under consideration to link the electricity networks of these countries.

South East Asian islands
Mainland Peninsular Malaysia is linked to Penang Island by two road bridges: the Penang Bridge and the Sultan Abdul Halim Muadzam Shah Bridge (Penang Second Bridge). To the south, it is linked to Singapore Island across the Straits of Johor by the Johor–Singapore Causeway and the Malaysia–Singapore Second Link; the former also carries Malaysia's West Coast Line to the island.

Passenger and vehicle ferries link the various islands of Indonesia, the Philippines, Singapore, Malaysia, and Papua New Guinea.

There are proposals to link Java, the most populated Island of Indonesia, to Sumatra via a proposed Sunda Strait Bridge and from Sumatra to Singapore and/or Malaysia via the Malacca Strait Bridge. While its construction has not yet started, but the completion date of the bridge is set to August 2025.

Hainan Island
The Guangdong–Hainan Ferry, or the Yuehai Ferry (part of the Guangdong–Hainan Railway)  is a vehicle and train ferry connecting Hainan Island to Guangdong in mainland China. The ferries run across the Qiongzhou Strait, between Zhanjiang, Guangdong and Haikou, Hainan. A road-rail bridge has been proposed.

Bohai Strait
Bohai Strait tunnel project is a proposed connection that would connect the Chinese cities of Yantai and Dalian across the Bohai Strait.

Taiwan
The Taiwan Strait Tunnel Project is a proposed undersea tunnel to connect Pingtan in the People's Republic of China to Hsinchu in northern Taiwan as part of the G3 Beijing–Taipei Expressway. First proposed in 1996, the project has since been subject to a number of academic discussions and feasibility studies, including by the China Railway Engineering Corporation.  There exist cross strait ferries, both within outlying islands of Taiwan and between the PRC and Taiwan. The political status of Taiwan complicates any such proposal.

South Korea
Since the Korean War travel overland from South Korea through North Korea to China and Russia has been blocked, South Korea maintains ferry services to Japan and China.

Korea to Japan
The "Korea Japan Friendship Tunnel System" is a proposal for a fixed link from the city of Fukuoka on Kyūshū, Japan, to the port city of Busan in Korea via four islands. Similar proposals have been discussed for decades by Korean and Japanese politicians. A road bridge links Kyūshū to the main Japanese island of Honshu.

Japan to Russia
The Seikan Tunnel has provided a rail link from the main Japanese Island of Honshu to the northernmost Japanese island of Hokkaido since 1988. The proposed Sakhalin-Hokkaido Tunnel would link Hokkaido to the Russian island of Sakhalin. When combined with the proposed Sakhalin Tunnel between Sakhalin and the Russian Mainland and an extension of the Baikal Amur Mainline this would give a rail link from Japan to Russia and the mainland of Asia.

Hong Kong–Zhuhai–Macau Bridge
The Hong Kong–Zhuhai–Macau Bridge links Hong Kong and Macau, and Zhuhai in China. Opened on October 24, 2018, it is the longest fixed crossing in the world.

Hōyo Strait
Shikoku and Kyushu are the only adjacent major Japanese islands not directly connected by a fixed link. Road travel between the two is possible only via Honshu, a detour of up to 600 km.

Since 1995, the Ōita and Ehime prefectures have been jointly conducting research into the technical feasibility of bridges over the Hōyo Strait and conducting basic research into natural and social conditions, and in 1998, in the "Hoyo Kaikyo Bridge Survey Report" it was concluded that the bridge would be technically feasible. The bridge proposed in the report uses a four-span suspension bridge with a central tower height of 376 m, central span length of 3,000 m, and bridge length of about 8,400 m as the main bridge, connecting the Toyo Strait with two bridges, the extension would be about 12.7 km. The total project cost is currently estimated to be about 1.3 trillion yen (US$12.1 billion).

The Hoyo Kaikyo Route Promotion Council conducted a survey comparing various crossing technologies (bridges, tunnels) and modes of transportation (automobiles, railways) in 1997, and "Transportation method comparison study report" was published. According to the report, in the case of bridges, road bridges are technically possible, but due to the long span, it is difficult to use them as railway bridges and combined bridges.

Qatar–Bahrain Causeway
The Qatar Bahrain Causeway was a planned causeway between the two Arab states of Qatar and Bahrain. It was expected that a ferry service would be established between the two countries in 2017.

Due to the Qatar diplomatic crisis and Bahrain's siding with Saudi Arabia, the bridge is very unlikely ever to be built.

King Fahd Causeway
The King Fahd Causeway is a series of bridges and causeways connecting Saudi Arabia and Bahrain. At , the western terminus of the causeway is the al-Khour neighbourhood of Khobar, Saudi Arabia and the eastern terminus is Al Jasra, Bahrain.

Seikan tunnel
One of the longest tunnels in the world and - depending on definitions (total length versus length actually under water) - either the longest or the second longest underwater tunnel ahead or behind of the Channel Tunnel, the Seikan Tunnel links Japan's northernmost main island Hokkaido to Honshu. Initially only built to Cape gauge, the rail line running through the tunnel has since been converted to dual gauge to allow standard gauge services, particularly Shinkansen. The Tōya Maru accident of 1954, in which a train ferry sank in a typhoon, killing over a thousand people, was a major factor in tilting the decision towards construction of the tunnel. The tunnel opened in 1988 and Hokkaido Shinkansen started running through it in 2016.

Bataan–Cavite Interlink Bridge
The Philippines is planning to build a bridge that will span the Manila Bay and connect the provinces of Bataan and Cavite. The implementation of the bridge project is projected to last six years.

In October 2020, the Department of Public Works and Highways (DPWH) signed a $59 million engineering design contract, awarded to the joint venture of T. Y. Lin International from the US and Korea's Pyunghwa Engineering Consultants Ltd., who are working in tandem with Geneva-based Renardet S.A. and local firm DCCD Engineering Corporation.

As of March 2023, the project's detailed engineering design is already 70% complete, according to DPWH. The construction of the bridge is targeted to start in late 2023.

Asia to America

Bering Strait bridge or tunnel

There is a proposal is to span the Bering Sea with a bridge or tunnel called the Intercontinental Peace Bridge, the TKM-World Link or the AmerAsian Peace Tunnel. This would link the American Cape Prince of Wales, with the Russian Cape Dezhnev. The Bering Strait Tunnel would consist of 3 tunnels connecting Alaska and Russia by going through two islands (the Little Diomede (USA) and Big Diomede (Russia)). The longest single tunnel would be . The three tunnel proposal is considered to be preferable over a bridge due to severe environmental conditions, especially the inescapable winter ice damage.

Each proposed tunnel would be shorter than some current tunnels.

To make a bridge or tunnel useful, a road or railway must be built to connect it, despite very difficult climate and very sparse population that makes roads less economically motivated. Until around 2010, such road connections were suggested by enthusiasts only, but at that time both the Russian government and the Alaskan state government started considering such roads. The Alaska Railroad is currently the only railroad in Alaska and disconnected from the wider North American rail network, but plans for an A2A Railway linking it to Alberta, Canada and from there the rest of the North American rail network are underway.

Oceania

Australia–Papua New Guinea Tunnel
A tunnel/bridge between the Australian mainland and the island of New Guinea, bridging the Torres Strait, is not considered economically feasible owing to the great distance. Cape York in northern Queensland is 140 km away from New Guinea. This is a very long distance compared to existing tunnels or bridges, and the demand for car travel is not so high; as of 2009 there are no car ferries between Australia and Papua New Guinea. Passenger travel is by air or private boat only.

Cook Strait
The Cook Strait between North Island and South Island of New Zealand has been suggested for a fixed link. The length would be at least 22 km, and the water depth is around 200 meters. This is mostly considered a too complicated and costly project to be realised.

The Americas

Vancouver Island
Ferry services link Vancouver Island to British Columbia on the Canadian Mainland and to the State of Washington in the US.

Proposals have been made for a fixed link to Vancouver Island for over a century. Because of the extreme depth and soft seabed of the Georgia Strait, and the potential for seismic activity, a bridge or tunnel would face monumental engineering, safety, and environmental challenges at a prohibitive cost.

Prince Edward Island
Prince Edward Island is linked to New Brunswick on the Canadian mainland by the Confederation Bridge which opened in 1997.

Newfoundland
Various proposals have been considered for a fixed link consisting of bridges, tunnels, and/or causeways across the Strait of Belle Isle, connecting the Province of Newfoundland and Labrador's mainland Labrador region with the island of Newfoundland.

Long Island
Nine bridges and 13 tunnels (including railroad tunnels) connect the New York City boroughs of Brooklyn and Queens, on Long Island, to Manhattan and Staten Island and, via these, to Newark in New Jersey and The Bronx on the mainland of New York state. However, no fixed crossing of the Long Island Sound exists east of New York City; most traffic from the mainland United States must pass through the city to access Long Island. Passenger and auto ferries connect Suffolk County on Long Island northward across the Sound to the mainland of New York state and eastward to the state of Connecticut. There have been various proposals, none successful, to replace these ferries with a fixed link across Long Island Sound to provide an alternate route around New York City for Long Island-bound traffic.

Delmarva
The Chesapeake Bay Bridge–Tunnel (CBBT) is a 23-mile-long (37 km) fixed link crossing the mouth of the United States' Chesapeake Bay, connecting the Delmarva Peninsula with Virginia Beach, Virginia. It opened in 1964.

Florida to Cuba, Hispaniola, and Puerto Rico
Ferry services between the US and Cuba and between Cuba and Haiti were common before 1960, but were suspended due to the United States embargo against Cuba. After the normalization of U.S.-Cuba diplomatic relations by U.S. President Barack Obama and Cuban President Raúl Castro, some American companies began plans to provide regular ferry services between Florida and Cuba. However, President Donald Trump reinstated many travel restrictions towards Cuba during his term, including prohibition of direct ferry services.

There is only one regular ferry to Havana from a foreign port: Cancún, Mexico.

A ferry travels between Mayagüez in Puerto Rico and Santo Domingo in the Dominican Republic.

Darién Gap

A notable break in the Pan-American Highway is a section of land located in the Darién Province in Panama and the Colombian border called the Darién Gap. It is an  stretch of rainforest. The gap has been crossed by adventurers on bicycle, motorcycle, all-terrain vehicle, and foot, dealing with jungle, swamp, insects, kidnapping, and other hazards.

Some people, groups, indigenous populations, and governments are opposed to completing the Darién portion of the highway. Reasons for opposition include protecting the rain forest, containing the spread of tropical diseases, protecting the livelihood of indigenous peoples in the area, and reducing the spread of drug trafficking and its associated violence from Colombia.

Transatlantic tunnel

A transatlantic tunnel is a theoretical tunnel that would span the Atlantic Ocean between North America and Europe possibly for such purposes as mass transit. Most conceptions of the tunnel envision it between the United States and the United Kingdom ‒ or more specifically between New York City and London.

Advantages compared to air travel would be increased speed and use of electricity instead of oil-based fuel.

The main barriers to constructing such a tunnel are cost, with estimates of between $88 billion and $175 billion, as well as the limits of current materials science.

See also
 Atlantropa
 Orkney tunnel
 Trans-Asian Railway
 List of transport megaprojects
 List of straits

References

 "The Three Americas Railway: An International and Intercontinental Enterprise" book written in 1881 by Hinton Rowan Helper discusses the need for an Intercontinental Highway, using railroads, starting on page 418. 
 "The Rotarian", January 1936. Article "Seeking Peace in a Concrete Way" starting on page 42.
 "Looking far north: the Harriman Expedition to Alaska, 1899" written in 1982 by William H. Goetzmann, Kay Sloan, writes that Harriman in 1899 proposed a "Round the World Railroad" (page 128). The authors go on to write that Harriman traveled to Japan a few years later to continue this proposal.
 "The Bering Strait Crossing: A 21st Century Frontier Between East and West" by James Oliver published in 2006 (256 pages) mentions extensively the Intercontinental Highway. He goes on to mention that the notion of a global highway has been around for hundreds of years including William Gilpen, who suggests it in 1846 was a proponent of a global rail highway to link to the then being proposed European and Asiatic Railway.
 "Planning and Design of Bridges" by M. S. Troitsky, 1994 describes many of the bridges and tunnels proposed in the Trans Global Highway article including on page 39 this book mentions that in 1958, T.Y. Lin mentions the possible construction of a Bering Strait bridge (and obviously a needed highway network).
 Alaska History: A Publication of the Alaska Historical Society, Volumes 4-6 (1989)  mentions on page 6 that in 1892, a man named Strauss proposed a global highway and a man made bridge over the Bering Strait. The article goes on to mention the Lin proposal of 1958.
 "Maritime Information Review"  a publication of the Netherlands Maritime Information Centre, in 1991 had an extensive article, on "strait crossings" covering the then proposed Bering Strait bridge, the Gibraltar Tunnel and so on, and mentions the proposed global highway network.
 Popular Mechanics Apr 1994 has an article "Alaska Siberia Bridge" and the article goes on to mention the construction of a global highway.

External links 
   Didik's original Trans-Global Highway proposal
 Map of its route
 The Schiller Institute article on the Trans Global Highway
 Wikivoyage, Wikimedia's global travel guide with information on driving in each country

Exploratory engineering
Transportation planning
Proposed undersea tunnels
Proposed bridges